Palaeoloxodon mnaidriensis is an extinct species of elephant from Malta belonging to the genus Palaeoloxodon. It is derived from the European mainland straight-tusked elephant (Palaeoloxodon antiquus). While previously thought to have inhabited both Malta and Sicily. P. mnaidriensis technically only represents the Maltese species, with remains from Sicily belonging to a separate species, provisionally referred to as P. cf. mnaidriensis. They descended from a colonisation of Sicily by P. antiquus during the late Middle Pleistocene, which replaced the even smaller 1 metre tall Palaeoloxodon falconeri, which had descended from a separate colonisation of Sicily by P. antiquus several hundred thousand years prior. The appearance of P. cf. mnaidriensis on Sicily marks a faunal turnover where the depauperate endemic fauna that characterised Sicily during the Early and early-mid Middle Pleistocene was replaced by the continental fauna of mainland Italy, including large predators like lions (Panthera spelaea), cave hyenas (Crocuta crocuta spelea) and wolves, and large herbivores including red deer, fallow deer, steppe bison, aurochs and the hippo Hippopotamus pentlandi, which coexisted with P. cf. mnaidriensis. On Malta, the only other large mammal present aside from P. mnaidriensis was the dwarf hippopotamus Hippopotamus melitensis. Its ecology has been suggested to have been that of a mixed feeder (both grazing and browsing). The youngest records of P. cf. mnaidriensis or a close relative are from what is now the island of Favignana, dating to around 30-20,000 years ago, during the Last Glacial Maximum.

See also

 Dwarf elephant

References

Palaeoloxodon
Pleistocene proboscideans
Pleistocene species
Pleistocene mammals of Europe
Taxa named by Andrew Leith Adams
Fauna of Malta
Fauna of Sicily
Fossil taxa described in 1874